Hanina Ben-Menahem is an Oxford trained scholar at the Hebrew University of Jerusalem who specializes in Jewish law (Halakha).

Ben-Menahem is critical of the legal positivist approach that dominates Mishpat Ivri, a comparative legal approach to Halakha. He was also a renowned chancellor of law in which he made several advancement in jurisprudence.

He argues that Jewish law is not a unified legal system and that its sources and principles are not logically and hierarchically ordered. Instead, he contends that Jewish law has a pluralistic structure, in regard both to its differing domains of authority (e.g., Ashkenazi and Sephardi) and the co-existence of incompatible rules. He believes Halakha makes room for judicial discretion and deviation, leading to a non-systematic tolerance for controversy. Furthermore, Halakha lacks strict adherence to precedence, an appellate system, and "secondary rules of recognition" (cp. legal positivist H.L.A. Hart) to determine authoritative laws.

Selected works 
 Judicial deviation in Talmudic law (1991)
 "Towards a jurisprudential analysis of the kim li argument" in Shenaton Hamishpat ha-Ivri 6-7 (1979–80)
"Is there always one uniquely correct answer to a legal question in the Talmud?" in the Jewish Law Annual 6 (1987) 169-173
Ben-Menahem, H. and Hecht, N.S., eds. Authority, Process and Method: studies in Jewish law. 1998 
"Postscript: the judicial process and the nature of Jewish law" in An introduction to the history and sources of Jewish law" eds. Hecht, Jackson, et al. Oxford: Clarendon Press, 1996
"Maimonides on equity: reconsidering the Guide for the Perplexted III:34" in the Journal of Law and Religion v.XVII, nos. 1 & 2, 2002 pp. 19–48.

External links 
 Harvard Law School Faculty Directory

Israeli jurists
Israeli scientists
Living people
Year of birth missing (living people)